Raimondo Manzini (1668–1744) was an Italian painter, active in Bologna, known for his depictions of flowers and animals. He was called the new Zeuxis. One of his pupils was Leonardo Sconzani.

References

1668 births
1744 deaths
17th-century Italian painters
18th-century Italian painters
Italian male painters
Italian genre painters
Painters from Bologna
18th-century Italian male artists